António Basto (born 9 November 1945) is a Portuguese former medley swimmer. He competed in the men's 400 metre individual medley at the 1964 Summer Olympics.

References

External links
 

1945 births
Living people
Portuguese male medley swimmers
Olympic swimmers of Portugal
Swimmers at the 1964 Summer Olympics
Swimmers from Lisbon